The Big Hop is a 1928 American silent Western film directed by James W. Horne and starring Buck Jones, Jobyna Ralston and Ernest Hilliard.

Synopsis
A ranch hand takes up aviation and participates in an air race to Honolulu. He faces off against a villainous rival for the woman he loves.

Cast
 Buck Jones as Buck Bronson
 Jobyna Ralston as June Halloway
 Ernest Hilliard as Ben Barnett
 Charles K. French as Buck Bronson's Father
 Charles Clary as June Halloway's Father
 Duke R. Lee as Ranch Foreman 
 Edward Hearn as Pilot
 Jack Dill as Mechanic

References

Bibliography
 Connelly, Robert B. The Silents: Silent Feature Films, 1910-36, Volume 40, Issue 2. December Press, 1998.
 Munden, Kenneth White. The American Film Institute Catalog of Motion Pictures Produced in the United States, Part 1. University of California Press, 1997.

External links
 

1928 films
1928 Western (genre) films
American silent feature films
Silent American Western (genre) films
American black-and-white films
Films directed by James W. Horne
1920s English-language films
1920s American films